The 2013 BMW Open was a men's tennis tournament played on outdoor clay courts. It was the 98th edition of the event, and part of the ATP World Tour 250 series of the 2013 ATP World Tour. It took place at the MTTC Iphitos complex in Munich, Germany, from 29 April through 5 May 2013. Third-seeded Tommy Haas won the singles title.

Singles main-draw entrants

Seeds

 Rankings are as of April 22, 2013.

Other entrants
The following players received wildcards into the main draw:
  Tobias Kamke
  Kevin Krawietz
  Gaël Monfils

The following players received entry from the qualifying draw:
  Matthias Bachinger
  Evgeny Korolev
  Łukasz Kubot
  John Millman

The following player received entry as lucky loser:
  Sergiy Stakhovsky

Withdrawals
Before the tournament
  Thomaz Bellucci
  Xavier Malisse
  Bernard Tomic

Doubles main-draw entrants

Seeds

 Rankings are as of April 22, 2013.

Other entrants
The following pairs received wildcards into the doubles main draw:
  Matthias Bachinger /  Daniel Brands
  Tommy Haas /  Radek Štěpánek

Champions

Singles

  Tommy Haas defeated  Philipp Kohlschreiber, 6–3, 7–6(7–3)

Doubles

 Jarkko Nieminen /  Dmitry Tursunov defeated  Marcos Baghdatis /  Eric Butorac, 6–1, 6–4

References

External links
Official website

 
2013 BMW Open
BMW Open
April 2013 sports events in Germany
May 2013 sports events in Germany